, he was a military monk and descendant of the Takeda clan of Aki province. He served the Mōri clan and later the Toyotomi clan.

Biography
Although it is certain that he was from the Aki Takeda clan, there are various theories about his birth year and father, and the former is said to have been in 1537 or 1539. 
There are two theories about the father: one says that Takeda Nobushige († 1541) was his father, and the other says that Takeda Shigekiyo († 1541), the father of Nobushige, was his father. In 1541, when the Aki Takeda were destroyed by Mori Motonari, he was taken away by faithful vassals and put in a safe place in Ankokuji Temple in Aki Province. He became a Rinzai Buddhist monk, and a diplomat of Mōri clan.

In 1582, during the Siege of Takamatsu, Mori sent Ekei to Kuroda Kanbei, offering peace negotiations with Hideyoshi.

In 1585 he was praised by Toyotomi Hideyoshi for his negotiation when the Mori clan formally served Hideyoshi, and become a close adviser of Hideyoshi. He was given a fiefdom of 23,000 koku in Iyo Province as a reward after the invasion of Shikoku (1585). 

In 1587, after he took part of the Kyushu Campaign, his holdings were expanded to 60,000 koku.

In 1590, he participated in the Odawara Campaign at siege of Shimoda.

In 1592, he participated in the Imjin war, and lost the Battle of Uiryong to Gwak Jae-u.

In 1600, at the Battle of Sekigahara, he fought against Tokugawa Ieyasu. He was later taken prisoner and condemned to death in Kyoto, along with Ishida Mitsunari and Konishi Yukinaga.

See also
Buddhism in Japan
List of Rinzai Buddhists

References

Further reading 

1539 births
1600 deaths
Daimyo
Japanese Buddhist clergy
People from Aki Province
Executed Japanese people
Rinzai Buddhists
Japanese Zen Buddhists
16th-century executions by Japan
People executed by Japan by decapitation
People of the Japanese invasions of Korea (1592–1598)